This article contains information about the literary events and publications of 1619.

Events
March – After the death of Richard Burbage, his place as leading actor of the King's Men in London is filled by Joseph Taylor.
April – Ben Jonson visits the Scottish poet William Drummond of Hawthornden.
c. October – After the death of Samuel Daniel in Somerset, his place as Poet Laureate of the Kingdom of England is filled by Ben Jonson.
unknown dates
René Descartes has a dream that helps him develop his ideas on analytical geometry.
William Jaggard and Thomas Pavier publish in London the so-called False Folio, a collection of Shakespearean and pseudo-Shakespearean plays mostly with false imprints and dates.

New books

Prose
Johannes Valentinus Andreae

Turris Babel
Jacob Boehme –  (On the Three Principles of Divine Being)
Philipp Clüver 
Sardinia et Corsica Antiqua
Siciliae Antique libri duo
Robert Fludd –  (The History of the Two Worlds, Volume 2)
Johannes Kepler –  (an attack on Fludd's Neoplatonist cosmology)
John Pitseus – 
Samuel Purchas – Purchas his Pilgrim or Microcosmus, or the Historie of Man. Relating the Wonders of his Generation, Vanities in his Degeneration, Necessities of his Regenerations
Paolo Sarpi – History of the Council of Trent
John Taylor – A Kicksey Winsey, or, A Lerry Come-Twang
William Whately – A Bride-Bvsh; or a Direction for Married Persons. Plainely describing the Dvties common to both, and peculiar to each of them

Drama
Anonymous – Two Wise Men and All the Rest Fools (published)
Beaumont and Fletcher (published)
A King and No King
The Maid's Tragedy
Gerbrand Adriaensz Bredero
De klucht van de koe

Lope de Vega – Fuente Ovejuna (published)
John Fletcher – The Humorous Lieutenant
John Fletcher and Philip Massinger – Sir John van Olden Barnavelt
Philip Massinger and Nathan Field – The Fatal Dowry (approximate date)
Thomas Middleton – The Masque of Heroes

Poetry

Robert Carliell –  (a defence of the new Church of England)
George Wither – Fidelia

Births
March 6 – Cyrano de Bergerac, French soldier and poet (died 1655)
June 24 – Rijcklof van Goens, Governor-General of the Dutch East Indies 1678–81 and travel writer (died 1682)
November 7 – Gédéon Tallemant des Réaux, French biographer (died 1692)
December 28 – Antoine Furetière, French satirist (died 1688)
unknown dates
Morgan Llwyd, Welsh preacher, poet and writer (died 1659)
Shalom Shabazi, Jewish Yemeni poet (died 1720)
probable
William Chamberlayne, English poet, playwright, physician and Royalist soldier (died 1703)
Alice Curwen, English autobiographer and Quaker (died 1679)
Henry (Heinrich) Oldenburg, German-born editor, correspondent and Royal Society secretary (died 1677)

Deaths
February 9 – Lucilio Vanini, Italian philosopher (born 1585)
February 12 – Pierre de Larivey, Italian-born French dramatist (born 1549)
March 13 – Richard Burbage, English actor and theatre proprietor (born c. 1567)
July 12 – Olivier de Serres, French writer on agriculture and horticulture (born 1539)
October 14 – Samuel Daniel, English Poet Laureate and historian (born 1562)
October 18 – Petrus Gudelinus, Dutch jurist (born 1550)
October 19 – Fujiwara Seika, Japanese philosopher (born 1561)
probable
Ginés Pérez de Hita, Spanish novelist and poet (born c. 1544)
Pierre de La Primaudaye, French Protestant writer (born 1546)

References

 
Years of the 17th century in literature